Rubén Toribio Díaz Rivas (born 17 April 1952 in Lima) is a retired professional footballer from Peru.

Club career
Díaz played for Deportivo Municipal, Universitario de Deportes and Sporting Cristal in Peru. During his time with Sporting Cristal he was part of three league championship winning campaigns (1979, 1980 & 1983).

International career
He competed for the Peru national football team at the 1978 and 1982 FIFA World Cup. He was part of the Peru team that won the Copa América in 1975. He made a total of 89 appearances for Peru, making him the 10th most capped player for the Peru team (as of April 2021).

External links 
 International statistics at rsssf

References 

1952 births
Living people
Footballers from Lima
Association football defenders
Peruvian footballers
Peru international footballers
1975 Copa América players
1978 FIFA World Cup players
1982 FIFA World Cup players
Peruvian Primera División players
Club Universitario de Deportes footballers
Sporting Cristal footballers
Deportivo Municipal footballers
Copa América-winning players
1983 Copa América players